Ryan Stuart is a Bahamian former basketball player who is best known for his college career at the University of Louisiana at Monroe between 1991–92 and 1992–93, which was known as Northeast Louisiana University when he attended.

A  forward, Stuart moved to the United States as a youth. He briefly played on his high school's varsity team, but quit because he wasn't getting enough playing time. After graduation, Stuart worked at his father's electric shop and was playing basketball at the local YMCA gym, where he was discovered by a scout from Lon Morris College and eventually enrolled at Lon Morris in Texas. He spent two years playing basketball at the junior college and averaged 24 points and 14 rebounds his sophomore year, was named MVP of the Texas JUCO all-star game & earned honorable mention JUCO All-American honors by Street & Smith magazine. He then went on to Northeast Louisiana for his final two seasons. In each of his two years as a Warhawk (known as the Indians at that time), Stuart led the Southland Conference in scoring. They earned berths into the NCAA tournament each season, and Stuart broke the 20-point scoring mark both times in losing causes to the Harold Miner-led USC Trojans in the 1992 tourney and the Acie Earl-led Iowa Hawkeyes in 1993, respectively. Stuart was named the Southland Conference Men's Basketball Player of the Year both times as well, becoming the first player since Andrew Toney to do so; and was also named conference Newcomer Of The Year after the 1991-92 season. Additionally, Stuart was named the Southland Conference tournament MVP each year as he led Northeast Louisiana to conference tournament championships. The Louisiana Sports Writers Association chose him as their Louisiana State Player of the Year in both 1992 and 1993. One reporter even called Stuart the conference's most dominating player since Karl Malone. Stuart, however, was never selected in the 1993 NBA Draft despite his successful collegiate career.

References

Year of birth missing (living people)
Living people
Bahamian men's basketball players
Bahamian expatriate basketball people in the United States
Basketball players from Louisiana
Forwards (basketball)
Lon Morris Bearcats basketball players
Louisiana–Monroe Warhawks men's basketball players